Several ships of the French Navy have borne the name Trident, after the Trident, often associated with the Roman God of the Sea, Neptune:

 Trident (1666), renamed Mercoeur and condemned in 1697.
 Trident (1671), condemned in 1686.
Later renamed Trident Prize, she was sunk as a breakwater in 1702 at Harwich.
 Trident (1695), broken up in 1720.
Sold in 1763.
 , condemned in 1857.
  (1876), an ironclad launched in 1876.

French Navy ship names